Cittareale is a  (municipality) in the Province of Rieti in the Italian region of Latium.

Cittareale borders the following municipalities: Accumoli, Amatrice, Borbona, Cascia, Leonessa, Montereale, Norcia, Posta. The source of the Velino river are in the communal territory.

Cittareal is home to a large Rocca (castle), which had a strategical importance due to its position between the Kingdom of Naples and the Papal States. Its current appearance date to the reconstruction by the Aragonese in 1479. The church of St. Peter in Vetozza was built over a pre-existing temple dedicated to Vacuna, and later was owned by the Abbey of Farfa.
 
The Roman emperor Vespasian was born nearby.

References

Cities and towns in Lazio